The Benson–Hammond House is a historic house located on Poplar Avenue in Linthicum Heights, Anne Arundel County, Maryland.

Description and history 
It is a -story, six-by-two-bay brick farmhouse constructed in the Greek Revival style in several stages at various times between about 1820 and 1870.

It was listed on the National Register of Historic Places on April 5, 1990.

References

External links
, including photo from 1984, at Maryland Historical Trust
Ann Arrundell County Historical Society website

Houses on the National Register of Historic Places in Maryland
Greek Revival houses in Maryland
Museums in Anne Arundel County, Maryland
Historic house museums in Maryland
Houses in Anne Arundel County, Maryland
National Register of Historic Places in Anne Arundel County, Maryland